The Portland Chamber Music Festival is an annual chamber music festival located in Portland, Maine, founded in 1994 by Jennifer Elowitch (violinist) and Dena Levine (pianist). In 2018, following PCMF's 25th anniversary season, Elowitch (Founder and Artistic Director Emerita) was succeeded by violist Melissa Reardon as Artistic Director. The core Festival is a four-concert main stage series and free Family Concert in August at the Abromson Community Education Center.
In addition, the Festival's year-round offerings include a Salon Series of concerts in private homes and intimate spaces throughout Greater Portland, and innovative contemporary music concerts in collaboration with SPACE Gallery.

Over the Festival's history, regional performances have been presented by organizations including Longy School of Music (Cambridge, MA), Harvard Musical Association (Boston, MA), Wolfeboro Friends of Music (NH), Bates College, Bowdoin College, and in Gardiner and Augusta, ME (presented by Johnson Hall). Festival concerts are broadcast regionally and nationally on Maine Public Classical, WGBH Radio in Boston, and American Public Media’s Performance Today. In 2011, the Maine Public Broadcasting Network chose PCMF to inaugurate its new “Maine Arts Live” initiative, featuring a live broadcast of PCMF Opening Night 2011 throughout the state and streaming on the web. 

Resident Artists include acclaimed performers, educators, composers, and arts leaders from ensembles, festivals, and top conservatories around the world, including the Metropolitan Opera Orchestra, Chicago Symphony, International Contemporary Ensemble, The Juilliard School, Curtis Institute, Aizuri Quartet, East Coast Chamber Orchestra, and many more.

Strongly committed to the performance of contemporary music, expansion of the chamber music canon, and cultivation of the next generation of chamber musicians, PCMF has commissioned new works from Eric Chasalow, Peter Askim, and Paul Wiancko; and has co-commissioned or co-produced dozens more. Resident Composers at PCMF have included Pulitzer Prize winner Melinda Wagner, Grammy Award winner Osvaldo Golijov, and Charles Ives Living Award winner Chen Yi. Past programs included an International Composers Competition and a Young Artist Apprentice Program which provided opportunities for an outstanding Maine string student to perform with artists of international stature.

References

External links
Official website of the Portland Chamber Music Festival

Music festivals established in 1994
Chamber music festivals
Classical music festivals in the United States
Culture of Portland, Maine
1994 establishments in Oregon